Zhang Hongjie (born April 1972) is a Chinese writer and historian who works in the Institute of Qing History, Renmin University of China. He is a member of the China Writers Association.

Biography
Zhang was born in Jianchang County, Liaoning in April 1972. He completed his bachelor's degree in economic in Dongbei University of Finance and Economics. He earned his doctor's degree in history from the Institute of Chinese Historical Geography, Fudan University. He did post-doctoral research at the Department of History, Tsinghua University.

In 2013, Zhang appeared on CCTV-10's Lecture Room programme.

Works

References

1972 births
Living people
People from Huludao
Writers from Liaoning
Dongbei University of Finance and Economics alumni 
Fudan University alumni
Tsinghua University alumni
Academic staff of Renmin University of China